Miss Grand Laos (Lao: ມີສແກຣນລາວ) is an annual female national beauty pageant of Laos, founded by Miss Laos Company Limited in 2017. The winner of which represents the country at its parent contest Miss Grand International. Since 2019, the franchise of the contest has belonged to Prime Modeling Agency which is managed by Saikeo Sidavong.

The reigning Miss Grand Laos is "Daomixay Phachansitthy" who was appointed to represent the country at the  pageant in Thailand, unfortunately, got non-placement.

Background

History

Prior to 2017, the Laos beauty pageant was not well known on the international stage, and only one national contest, Miss Laos was held annually, however, the winners of which did not participate in any international platforms.

Under Sidavong management, his first affiliated Miss Grand Laos was determined through  contest, however, such an elected titleholder did not participate at the international stage Miss Grand International 2019 in Venezuela due to VISA issues. The following country representatives, Phatthana Khidaphone in 2020 and Daomixay Phachansitthy in 2021, were appointed to the position without organizing the Miss Grand national pageant as a result of the COVID-19 pandemic.

Since its inception, the Miss Grand Laos has been arranged under the rigorous control of the Lao People's Revolutionary Party's established governor, the Lao People's Revolutionary Youth Union (Lao:ສູນກາງຊາວໜຸ່ມປະຊາຊົນປະຕິວັດລາວ), which is dedicated to focusing on the fields of information, media, entertainment, art, and music as well as the domestic pageant industry.

Edition
The following list is the edition detail of the Miss Grand Laos contest, since its inception in 2017.

Selection of contestants
In the first two editions of the Miss Grand Laos contest, the national aspirants were directly selected by the central organizer through an online application. Later in 2022, Miss Grand Laos began franchising the provincial competitions to individual organizers, who would name eighteen provincial titleholders to compete in the national pageant.

Titleholders

Gallery

National finalists
The following list is the national finalists of the Miss Grand Laos pageant, as well as the competition results.
Color keys
 Declared as the winner
 Ended as a runner-up 
 Ended as a semifinalist 
 Ended as a quarterfinalist 
 Did not participate

See also
 Lao beauty pageants

References

External links

 Miss Grand Laos official website

Laos
Recurring events established in 2017
Beauty pageants in Laos